Oreohelix subrudis is a species of air-breathing land snail, a terrestrial pulmonate gastropod mollusk in the family Oreohelicidae.

References

Oreohelicidae
Gastropods described in 1854